"Come On Up to the House" is a song originally sung by American singer-songwriter Tom Waits and co-written by Waits and Kathleen Brennan for his 1999 album Mule Variations. Andrew Borger, Joe Gore, Charlie Musselwhite, Nik Phelps, Larry Taylor perform the song with Waits.

The name of the song was used for a tribute album of Tom Waits covers by well known female singer-songwriters, called Come On Up to the House: Women Sing Waits.

Cover versions
2009 Sarah Jarosz on the album Song Up in Her Head
2010 Thrice
2012 Willie Nelson on the album Heroes (with Sheryl Crow and Lukas Nelson)
2016 The Devil Makes Three on the album Redemption and Ruin
2019 Joseph on the Come On Up to the House: Women Sing Waits tribute album.

References

Songs written by Tom Waits
Tom Waits songs
1999 songs
Songs written by Kathleen Brennan